The Gold Diggers is a 1983 British film directed by Sally Potter, her debut, and stars Julie Christie, Kassandra Colson and Siobhan Davies. It was written by Sally Potter and Rose English. The movie was made with an all-female crew, and features photography by Babette Mangolte and a score by Lindsay Cooper.

Film festivals
Berlin International Film Festival, Germany
Sydney Film Festival, Australia, Melbourne
International Film Festival, Australia
International Film Festival Rotterdam, Netherlands

Awards
Berlin International Film Festival, Germany – Won ‘Zitty’ Audience Award
Florence International Film Festival, Italy – Won Best Film

External links

The Gold Diggers at AllRovi
The Gold Diggers at sallypotter.com

1983 films
British musical drama films
Films directed by Sally Potter
1980s English-language films
1980s British films